Joseph de Picciotto Bey was a Sephardi Jewish senator appointed by Fuad I of Egypt (1924), an expert in economics, and a member of the board of directors of several companies, among them the bank Cassa di Sconto e di Risparmio.

He contributed periodically to al-Muqattam, where his economic and financial studies were well received.

In Egypt, at the request of Senator Joseph de Picciotto Bey, the Senate decided, according to press reports, not to hold meetings on the Sabbath day.

Joseph de Picciotto Bey was the Gabbay of "Eliyahu Hanavi Synagogue" in Alexandria, Egypt (1914–1932).

References

External links
 Senator Joseph De Picciotto Bey Geni Account
 The Sephardim in Egypt

1872 births
1938 deaths
Egyptian bankers
Egyptian Sephardi Jews
20th-century Egyptian economists
20th-century Egyptian politicians
Jewish Egyptian politicians
Politicians from Alexandria